The eBay API is an Application Programming Interface for interacting directly with the eBay database. The communication occurs over the Internet in the XML format. Using the API, an application can provide a custom interface, functionality or specialized operations not otherwise afforded by the eBay interface.

Functionalities

With the eBay API, developers can create programs that can
 Display eBay listings
 Get high-bidder information for sold items
 Get the current list of eBay categories
 Leave feedback about other users when finishing a commerce transaction  
 Retrieve lists of items a particular user is currently selling
 Retrieve lists of items a particular user has bid
 Submit items for listing on eBay
 View information about items listed on eBay

As the API does not depend upon the eBay User Interface, this makes it possible to create stable, custom functionality and interfaces that meet business needs.

eBay APIs
 Trading Api
 
 Feedback Api
 Open Api

See also
 eBay

References

External links
 What is the eBay API?

EBay
Application programming interfaces